Santrampur is one of the 182 Legislative Assembly constituencies of Gujarat state in India. It is part of Mahisagar district and is reserved for candidates belonging to the Scheduled Tribes.

List of segments

This assembly seat represents the following segments,

 Santrampur Taluka (Part) Villages – Chitva, Bugad, Bugadna Muvada, Kanzara (Sant), Vyar, Paniyar, Bhana Simal, Khedaya (Pratapgadh), Kunda, Bhamari, Simaliya, Sarad, Kotra, Moti Kyar, Nani Kyar, Kyariya, Taladra, Pithapur (Borvada), Nalai, Timbla, Bhandara, Batakwada, Molara, Ukhreli, Daliyati, Bhenadra, Sagvadiya (Sant), Kanjara (Sant), Barikota, Pancha Muvadi, Metana Muvada, Dotawada, Surpur, Mota Sarnaiya, Babrol, Gada, Sangawada, Vadiya, Kasalpur, Endra, Moti Kharsoli, Vanta (Mahetana), Vavia Muvada, Kasiya, Asivada, Chela Pagina Muvada, Gala Talawadi, Gamdi, Pagina Muvada, Kothina Muvada, Movasa, Bavana Saliya, Dahela, Bhotva (West), Limada Muvadi, Ranijini Padedi, Lalakpur, Garadiya, Malanpur, Nana Natva, Sada, Babrai, Hirapura, Vanjiya Khunt, Narsingpur, Timbharva, Sant (Rampur), Zab (West), Hadani Sarsan, Moti Sarsan, Ranani Sarsan, Chhayan, Savgadh, Boidiya, Guvaliya, Galaliya, Nani Sarsan, Andarsing Na Muvada, Gothibda, Kosamba, Benada, Hathipura, Nes Hathipura, Gothib, Nana Ambela, Mota Ambela, Galakhedi, Bhavanpura, Parthampur, Kherva, Padedi Ador, Kotvat, Khodadra, Falwa, Valakhedi, Rayaniya, Ratanpur (Gothib), Kaliya Amba, Bhotva (East), Kaduchi, Janvad, Ranela, Sanbar, Sukatimba, Moralnaka, Chinchani, Moti Bhugedi, Nani Bhugedi, Sagan Faliya, Santrampur (M)
 Kadana Taluka

Members of the Legislative Assembly

Election results

2022

2017

2012

See also
 List of constituencies of Gujarat Legislative Assembly
 Gujarat Legislative Assembly

References

External links
 

Assembly constituencies of Gujarat
Mahisagar district